Sulfinylmethane or sulfine is an organic compound with molecular formula H2CSO. It is the simplest sulfine. Sulfines are chemical compounds with the general structure XY=SO. IUPAC considers the term 'sulfine' obsolete, preferring instead thiocarbonyl S-oxide, despite this the use of the term sulfine still predominates in the chemical literature.

Substituted sulfines
The parent sulfine H2CSO is very labile, whereas substituted derivatives are more conveniently isolated.  One example is syn-propanethial-S-oxide which is produced from allicin and is responsible for eye-watering effects of cutting onions. Another example is diphenylsulfine, obtained by oxidation of thiobenzophenone:
(C6H5)2C=S  +  [O]  →   (C6H5)2C=S=O

See also
 Sulfene - related functional group with the formula H2C=SO2
Ethenone
Heterocumulene

References

Organosulfur compounds